Connie Francis Sings Italian Favorites is a studio album recorded by American singer and entertainer Connie Francis.

Background
The album consists of traditional Italian and Neapolitan songs (e. g. Santa Lucia) as well as then-current contemporary songs like Volare (Nel blu dipinto di blu) or Piove which both had risen to international fame after being Italy's entries to the Eurovision Song Contests of 1958 and 1959.

Connie Francis Sings Italian Favorites was recorded following a suggestion from Francis' father, George Franconero Sr., who played an active part in directing Francis' career. He had realized that Francis would have to make a timely transition from the youth-oriented Rock 'n' Roll music to adult contemporary music if she wanted to pursue a successful long-term career in music.

To make the album appealing to both Italian immigrants as well as listeners not familiar with Romanic languages, Francis sang most of the songs bilingual in either Italian/English or Neapolitan/English. Only Volare and Piove are sung entirely in Italian whilst Torna a Surriento is sung entirely in Neapolitan. Francis, who didn't learn to speak Italian and Neapolitan fluently until 1962, received assistance from a Berlitz teacher to achieve the correct pronunciation of the lyrics' Italian and Neapolitan lines.

The album was recorded between August 22 and 27, 1959, at EMI's famous Abbey Road Studios in London under the musical direction of Tony Osborne and was released in November 1959. Soon afterwards it entered the album charts where it remained for 81 weeks, peaking at # 4. It remains to this day as Francis' most successful album release.

Following the success of Connie Francis sings Italian Favorites, Francis recorded seven more albums of "Favorites" between 1960 and 1964, including Jewish, German and Irish Favorites, among others.

Track listing

Side A

Side B

Not included songs from the sessions

References

Connie Francis albums
1959 albums
Italian-language albums
MGM Records albums
Albums produced by Danny Davis (country musician)